USS De Haven (DD-469) was a  of the United States Navy, the first Navy ship named for Lieutenant Edwin J. De Haven USN (1819–1865). De Haven was the first Fletcher-class ship lost in World War II, having been in commission only 133 days.

De Haven was laid down by the Bath Iron Works Corporation at Bath, Maine on 27 September 1941 and launched on 28 June 1942 by Miss H. N. De Haven, granddaughter of Lieutenant De Haven. The ship was commissioned on 21 September 1942, Commander Charles E. Tolman in command.

Service history
De Haven sailed from Norfolk, Va. and reached Tongatapu, Tonga Islands, 28 November 1942 to escort a convoy of troopships to Guadalcanal to relieve the Marines who had been there since the invasion landings in August. De Haven screened the transports off Guadalcanal from 7 to 14 December, then sailed out of Espiritu Santo and Nouméa in the continuing Solomon Islands operations. She patrolled in the waters of the Southern Solomons to stop the "Tokyo Express", the nightly effort to supply the beleaguered Japanese troops still fighting on the invaded islands, and took part in two bombardments of Kolombangara island during January 1943.

On 1 February 1943, De Haven screened six LCTs and a seaplane tender establishing a beachhead at Maravovo on Guadalcanal. While escorting two of the landing craft back to their base in the afternoon, De Haven was warned of an impending air attack by Japanese aircraft supporting Operation Ke. She sighted nine unidentified planes and opened fire as six swung sharply toward her. She shot down three of these planes, but not before all six had dropped their bombs. De Haven was hit by three bombs and further damaged by a near miss. One bomb hit the superstructure squarely, killing the commanding officer instantly. All was lost after the first hit and the ship began to settle rapidly, sinking about 2 miles east of Savo Island, thereby becoming part of Ironbottom Sound. One of the LCTs she had escorted rescued the survivors. De Haven lost 167 killed and 38 wounded.

Her wreck was discovered by Robert Ballard in 1992.

Honors
De Haven received one battle star for her World War II service.

References

 Roll of Honor

External links

USS De Haven website at Destroyer History Foundation
First DeHaven (DD-469) at USS DeHaven Sailors Association
navsource.org: USS De Haven
hazegray.org: USS De Haven

Roll of Honor

 

World War II destroyers of the United States
Shipwrecks in Ironbottom Sound
Ships built in Bath, Maine
1942 ships
Fletcher-class destroyers of the United States Navy
Destroyers sunk by aircraft
Maritime incidents in February 1943
Ships sunk by Japanese aircraft
1992 archaeological discoveries